Hudson Fernando Tobias de Carvalho (born 18 July 1986), simply known as Hudson, is a Brazilian footballer who plays for Imperatriz as a right back.

External links
Futebol de Goyaz profile 

Profile at iDNES.cz 

1986 births
Living people
Brazilian footballers
Association football defenders
Campeonato Brasileiro Série C players
Campeonato Brasileiro Série D players
Czech First League players
Clube Atlético Sorocaba players
Treze Futebol Clube players
Fortaleza Esporte Clube players
Centro Sportivo Alagoano players
Rio Claro Futebol Clube players
Bangu Atlético Clube players
América Futebol Clube (RN) players
Associação Portuguesa de Desportos players
Nõmme Kalju FC players
FC Slovan Liberec players
SK Dynamo České Budějovice players
Sociedade Imperatriz de Desportos players
Brazilian expatriate footballers
Brazilian expatriate sportspeople in Estonia
Brazilian expatriate sportspeople in the Czech Republic
Expatriate footballers in Estonia
Expatriate footballers in the Czech Republic
Footballers from São Paulo (state)